Mount Banang is a mountain in Batu Pahat District, Johor, Malaysia.

It is famous and have been made into song and appeared in movies made by Malay Film Production Limited.

See also
 Geography of Malaysia

References

External links
Official video of the Malasya education department

Batu Pahat District
Banang